RDA may refer to:

Laws
 Rules of Decision Act, 1789, United States
 Racial Discrimination Act 1975, Australia

Organisations

Government bodies
 Rawalpindi Development Authority, Pakistan (founded 1989)
 Regional development agency, a class of local body in England (1998–2010)
 Road Development Authority, Sri Lanka (founded 1971)

Other organisations
 Rassemblement Démocratique Africain (1946–1958), a political party in French West Africa
 Reader's Digest Association, an American publisher
 Research Data Alliance, a research community organisation started in 2013
 Revolving Doors Agency, a British charity
 Riding for the Disabled Association, a British equestrian charity
 Rural Development Academy, an institution in Bangladesh

People
 Rafael dos Anjos (born 1984), Brazilian mixed martial artist
 Richard Dean Anderson (born 1950), American actor

Science, technology and mathematics

Biology and medicine
 Recommended Dietary Allowance, one of several recommendations referred to as a Dietary Reference Intake
 Representational difference analysis, a technique used to find sequence differences in two genomic or cDNA samples
 Registered dental assistant
 Relative dentin abrasivity, a measure of toothpaste's effects on tooth dentin

Computing
 Remote Database Access, a protocol
 Robotic data automation, the automation of tasks
 Remote diagnostic agent, an Oracle database diagnostic tool

Other uses in science and mathematics
 Retro-Diels–Alder reaction (rDA), a chemical reaction
 Research and Development Array, a cosmic ray detector development project
 Redundancy analysis, a method for ordination
 Research Data Australia, a web portal for access to national research data, within Australian Research Data Commons

Other uses
 Redland railway station, Bristol, England (CRS code: RDA)
 Resource Description and Access, a library cataloguing standard
 Resources Development Administration, a fictional organisation in the Avatar films